Pennsylvania State Senate District 5  includes parts of Philadelphia County. It is currently represented by Democrat Jimmy Dillon.

District profile
The district includes the following areas:

Philadelphia County:
Ward 41
Ward 56
Ward 57
Ward 58
Ward 63
Ward 64
Ward 65
Ward 66

Senators

References

Pennsylvania Senate districts
Government of Philadelphia